Ryan Jared Thomas (born 20 December 1994) is a New Zealand professional footballer who plays as a midfielder for PEC Zwolle in the Eerste divisie and the New Zealand national team.

Thomas played for various clubs across the Waikato region of New Zealand, before signing professional terms with Eredivisie club PEC Zwolle in 2013. Since then, Thomas has spent his footballing career in the Netherlands, signing for reigning champions PSV Eindhoven in 2018. Thomas is additionally a regular for the New Zealand national team, featuring in the 2017 FIFA Confederations Cup.

Club career

New Zealand
Thomas was born in Te Puke, New Zealand, attended Tauranga Boys' College and played his youth football at Mount Maunganui Tauranga City AFC and Waikato club Melville United in the NRFL Premier. He made his debut off the bench on 30 July 2011, alongside fellow current professional Jesse Edge, and scored in the 3–1 win against Forrest Hill Milford.

Thomas was announced as part of the squad for New Zealand Football Championship side Waikato FC at the beginning of the 2011–12 season, joining other future New Zealand international Tyler Boyd.

Thomas was later convinced by his previous Waikato FC manager, Declan Edge, to leave his current side to join the Olé Football Academy in Wellington, along with several other Waikato players. During this time, Thomas played for the Olé Academy-affiliated club Western Suburbs. Noting Thomas' exceptional talent, Edge organised a trial for the 18-year-old at Eredivisie club PEC Zwolle.

PEC Zwolle
Following a successful trial period in the Netherlands, Thomas signed for PEC Zwolle in September 2013, and made his debut for the club on 30 October 2013 against amateur side Wilhelmina '08 in the third round of the KNVB Cup, scoring the first goal in a 4–0 win. He quickly became a key winger for the club; his successful debut season culminated in winning the KNVB Cup, with Thomas scoring two goals in the final in a 5–1 win over AFC Ajax.

Thomas continued to impress for PEC Zwolle in the following seasons following his transition to a holding midfielder, with his rise being compared to that of Dutch legend Arjen Robben by former manager Ron Jans. In a 2017 interview, Jans stated that "it would not surprise me if he ended up at Real Madrid".

PSV
On 10 August 2018, Thomas joined reigning Eredivisie champions PSV for an undisclosed fee on a three-year contract. The move was described by former New Zealand and Eredivisie footballer Ivan Vicelich as one of the biggest deals ever by a New Zealander. Just days after signing, however, Thomas sustained a knee injury in training; originally thought to be only a minor sprain, it was later discovered to be a serious anterior cruciate ligament tear, meaning Thomas spent the rest of the season sidelined. As part of his rehabilitation, Thomas spent time working with Olympic swimming champion Pieter van den Hoogenband.

On 6 October 2019, after 14 months out injured, Thomas finally made his debut for PSV as an 85th minute substitute for Érick Gutiérrez in a 4−1 win over VVV Venlo.

After four injury-riddled seasons, during which he had four surgeries on his knee in total, Thomas was released by PSV in June 2022.

Return to PEC Zwolle
On 26 October 2022, Dutch side PEC Zwolle now playing in the Eerste Divisie announced that they had resigned Thomas.

International career
Thomas made his international debut for New Zealand when he played in a 2–4 friendly loss to Japan in March 2014. He scored his first international goals on 28 March 2017, netting a brace in a 2–0 win over Fiji.

International goals
Scores and results list New Zealand's goal tally first.

Honours

Club
Waikato FC
NZF Cup runner-up: 2011–12

PEC Zwolle
KNVB Cup: 2013–14; runner-up 2014–15
Johan Cruijff Shield: 2014

International
OFC U-20 Championship: 2013

Individual
 Oceania Footballer of the Year, 2015
 IFFHS OFC Men's Team of the Decade 2011–2020
IFFHS Oceania Men's Team of All Time: 2021

References

External links
 
 
 

1994 births
Living people
People from Te Puke
Association football midfielders
Sportspeople from the Bay of Plenty Region
New Zealand association footballers
PEC Zwolle players
PSV Eindhoven players
Eredivisie players
New Zealand under-20 international footballers
New Zealand international footballers
2017 FIFA Confederations Cup players
New Zealand expatriate association footballers
Expatriate footballers in the Netherlands
New Zealand expatriate sportspeople in the Netherlands